Malcolm Edward Gregson (born 15 August 1943) is an English professional golfer. After a promising start to his career as an amateur and assistant professional, he had one exceptional year, 1967, when he won the Harry Vardon Trophy and played in the Ryder Cup, but had only limited success afterwards. After reaching 50 he played on the European Senior Tour, winning five times.

Early life and amateur career
Gregson was born in Leicester and educated at Millfield School in Somerset from 1957 to 1960. In 1957 he reached the last-16 of the Boys Amateur Championship, a week after his 14th birthday. In 1959 he represented England boys in their annual match against Scotland, played just before the Boys Championship. In 1960 he again played for England boys against Scotland and was also selected for a combined England and Scotland team to play a Continental Europe team.

Professional career
Gregson turned professional in 1961 becoming an assistant professional to Pat Keene at Moor Park Golf Club. In 1963 he reached quarter-finals of the News of the World Match Play and was runner-up, with Tony Jacklin, in the Coombe Hill Assistants' Tournament. In 1964 he won the Gor-Ray Cup, the assistants' championship. The event was reduced to 54 holes after the second round was abandoned because of bad weather, Gregson winning by three strokes from Richard Davies and Hedley Muscroft. Later in the year he had a top-20 finish in the Open Championship and was runner-up in the Gleneagles Hotel Foursomes Tournament.

Gregson played in Asia in early 1967. In April he had a run of success. At the start of the month he finished tied for fourth place in the Taiwan Open. Two week later he lost to Kenji Hosoishi in a playoff for the Indian Open and he then finished third in the Kenya Open the following week. Returning to England he won the Schweppes PGA Championship at the end of the month, with rounds of 67 and 65 on the final day to beat Hugh Boyle by three strokes. In June he won the Daks Tournament at Wentworth, beating Neil Coles by two strokes, after final day rounds of 67 and 66, and was a joint winner of the Martini International with Brian Huggett. Qualification for the British team for the 1967 Ryder Cup was based on a points system using performances in 1966 and 1967, finishing after the 1967 Open Championship. Despite having few points in 1966, Gregson's three wins lifted to eighth in the list to gain a place in the team. He did not get an automatic entry into the Open championship, having finished outside the top-30 in the Order of Merit in 1966. After rounds of 76 and 73 he was qualified after getting through an 8-man playoff for two places. In the Ryder Cup, Gregson lost all four matches he played in, the Americans winning the cup by 15 points. He collected the Harry Vardon Trophy as leader of the Order of Merit, which was based on a points system, and also made his only appearance for England in the World Cup which was played in Mexico City a few weeks after the Ryder Cup. Playing with Peter Alliss they finished tied for 13th place in the team event but Gregson finished tied for 6th in the individual standings.

In 1968 Gregson won the Daks Tournament for the second successive year. He had a final round 69 to finish a stroke ahead of Neil Coles. In October he qualified for the PGA Tour through their Qualifying school. Gregson played on the 1969 PGA Tour from February to May but had limited success. He was a runner-up in the 1969 Gallaher Ulster Open behind Christy O'Connor Snr.

Gregson made the top one hundred on the Order of Merit in each of the European Tour's first nine official seasons from 1972 to 1980. He was twice a runner-up in the Dutch Open, in 1972 to Jack Newton and in 1979 to another Australian Graham Marsh. In late 1978 he finished fourth in both Tournament Players Championship and the European Open Championship. In 1972, playing with Brian Huggett, he won the Sumrie Better-Ball at Blairgowrie, a non-tour event. The pair were runners-up in the same event the following year.

Gregson was a regular competitor on the Safari Circuit, winning the 1974 Cock o' the North in Zambia, beating Jack Newton in a playoff. He was runner-up a number of times, including the Kenya Open in 1970 and 1974, the 1972 Zambia Open, the Nigerian Open in 1973 and 1977 and the 1985 Cock o' the North.

Gregson played once on the European Senior Tour in 1993, soon after his 50th birthday and then competed regularly on the tour from 1994, making over 200 appearances before making his final appearance in 2008. He finished in the top 10 of the Order of Merit from 1994 to 1997 and won five events on the tour between 1994 and 2004.

Professional wins (12)

Other wins (7)

European Senior Tour wins (5)

European Senior Tour playoff record (0–3)

Results in major championships

Note: Gregson never played in the U.S. Open or PGA Championship.

CUT = missed the half-way cut (3rd round cut in 1969 and 1975 Open Championships)
"T" = tied

Team appearances
Ryder Cup (representing Great Britain): 1967
World Cup (representing England): 1967
R.T.V. International Trophy (representing England): 1967 (winners)
Double Diamond International (representing England): 1975
Praia d'El Rey European Cup: 1997 (winners)

See also 

 Fall 1968 PGA Tour Qualifying School graduates

References

External links

English male golfers
European Tour golfers
European Senior Tour golfers
Ryder Cup competitors for Europe
Sportspeople from Leicester
People educated at Millfield
1943 births
Living people